The Dirt and the Stars is the sixteenth studio album by American singer-songwriter Mary Chapin Carpenter. It was released on August 7, 2020 by Lambent Light Records.

Background and recording
In a press release, Carpenter described the songs on the album as "very personal" and "difficult in some ways, and definitely come from places of pain and self-illumination, but also places of joy, discovery and the rewards of self- knowledge." She wrote the album at her Virginia farmhouse and recorded it at Peter Gabriel's Real World Studios near Bath, England between January and February 2020 prior to lockdowns stemming from the COVID-19 pandemic.

Critical reception
Bob Paxman of Sounds of Nashville gave The Dirt and the Stars a positive review, praising Carpenter for her ability to "[get] her message across with lyrical passages that could easily pass for straight poetry" and the album's cohesiveness that allows the songs to "build with nice opening sequences". Thom Jurek of AllMusic gave the album four out of five stars, highlighting the use of Carpenter's "empathic" band to "erase all boundaries between singer and song", and describing it as one of her standout albums from her entire repertoire. Sam Sodomsky of Pitchfork was similarly positive, giving the album a 7.7 out of 10. He wrote: "Three decades into her career, one of country music’s most reliable and empathetic songwriters offers a profoundly intimate record, full of hushed revelations."

Track listing

Vinyl-only bonus tracks

Spotify, iTunes and Apple Music bonus tracks

Personnel
 Mary Chapin Carpenter – vocals, acoustic guitar
 Jeremy Stacey – drums, percussion
 Nick Pini – electric and double bass, Moog
 Matt Rollings – piano, Hammond organ
 Duke Levine – electric guitar, 12 string acoustic guitar, mandolin
 Ethan Johns – mandolin, continuum, electric guitar, percussion, drums

Technical personnel
 Ethan Johns – producer
 Jamie Melford and Mary Chapin Carpenter, co-producers (bonus track "Our Man Walter Cronkite" only)
 Dom Monks – engineer, mixing
 Matt Colton – mastering
 Aaron Farrington and Chris Tetzeli – photography
 Mark Berger – package layout

Chart performance

References

2020 albums
Mary Chapin Carpenter albums
Albums produced by Ethan Johns